Night of Violence is a 1965 Italian film directed by Roberto Mauri and starring Helene Chanel and Marilu Tolo. It was initially banned in Italy on the time of its release, and released in France first as Call Girls 66. It was released later in Italy heavily edited and with some re-dubbed dialogue.

Premise
The police strive to catch a masked serial killer who focuses on women.

Cast

Production
Night of Violence was developed under the name L'uomo venuto da Hiroshima.

Release and reception
Night of Violence was initially banned in Italy for obscenity due to the amount of female nudity in the film. It was eventually released in France under the title Call Girls 66 in 1965 and released months later in 1966 in Italy under the title Le notti della violenza. The theatrical released had many cuts and some re-dubbed dialogue.

It received a brief release in Milan in 1967, where it had a brief review in Corriere della Sera who described it as a "crude fumetto."

References

Sources

External links
 

1965 films
Giallo films
1960s Italian-language films
1960s crime thriller films
Films directed by Roberto Mauri
Films with screenplays by Edoardo Mulargia
1960s Italian films